The England national netball team travelled to New Zealand in September 2021 for a three-match series against the New Zealand national netball team. The two teams contested the Taini Jamison Trophy, which was last staged in 2020. The trophy was won by England, who won the series 2–1. It was the first time that England had won a series in New Zealand.

Background
England and New Zealand last played each other in 2020. New Zealand won that series 3–0. The 2021 series was used as preparation for the 2022 Commonwealth Games, and the teams were competing for the Taini Jamison Trophy. All matches were played at the Christchurch Arena.  In New Zealand, all matches of the series were broadcast on Sky Sport, and were then re-run later in the day on free-to-air channel TVNZ 2. In the United Kingdom, all matches were broadcast on Sky Sports.

The England team arrived in New Zealand in late August 2021, as they had to isolate on arrival. Four Australian-based England players were unable to travel to New Zealand for the series due to COVID-19 related travel restrictions between the two countries. The players in question were Natalie Haythornthwaite, Stacey Francis-Bayman, Helen Housby and Jo Harten. New Zealand's preparations for the series were disrupted by a COVID-19 lockdown in Auckland and restrictions in Wellington, which prevented players from training with each other prior to the series. Because of the Auckland lockdown, many staff members including team manager Esther Molloy were unable to travel and so missed the series. Four Auckland-based players including captain Gina Crampton were given a government exemption to travel, thus allowing them to compete in the series.

Squads

Matches

First Test
New Zealand led the match until near the start of the fourth quarter, when the scores were level at 38–38. New Zealand then took control of the match, and won 48–42.

Second Test
New Zealand led the match 24–21 at half-time, before England won the third quarter 16–10. In the final quarter, England scored 11 goals in five minutes, and won 55–45 to level the series at 1–1. It was England's first win in New Zealand since September 2018.

Third Test
At half-time, New Zealand were ahead by 10 points. England reduced their deficit to four points by the end of the third quarter, and then took the lead with around 10 minutes to go in the match. They held on for victory. As a result, England won the series 2–1; it was their first ever series win in New Zealand.

Post-series
Following this series, England were originally scheduled to play a series in Australia in October 2021, though the series was later cancelled due to changes in COVID travel rules between Australia and New Zealand. New Zealand were also scheduled to tour Australia in October 2021, but that series was replaced by invitational matches against a New Zealand men's netball team.

References

2021
2021 in New Zealand netball
2021 in English netball
International netball competitions hosted by New Zealand
New Zealand national netball team series
England national netball team series
September 2021 sports events in New Zealand